The flag of Prague, officially the flag of the capital city of Prague is one of the symbols of Prague, alongside the coat of arms of Prague.

Flags of the districts and municipal parts
The 57 districts of Prague and municipal parts have their own flags.

References

Flags of the Czech Republic